Alexander Arthur Evans  (3 November 1881 – 3 June 1955) was an Australian politician.

He was born in Launceston. In 1936 he was elected to the Tasmanian Legislative Council as the independent member for Launceston. He served until his defeat in 1942. Evans died in 1955 in Hobart.

References

1881 births
1955 deaths
Independent members of the Parliament of Tasmania
Members of the Tasmanian Legislative Council
Companions of the Distinguished Service Order
Recipients of the Military Cross
20th-century Australian politicians